Copernicus Cup is an annual indoor track and field competition which takes place in February at the multi-purpose sports and entertainment Arena Toruń in Toruń, Poland. The meeting is currently an IAAF World Indoor Tour Meeting. In 2019, the competition's title sponsor was PKN Orlen.

The venue also hosted the 2021 European Athletics Indoor Championships from 4 to 7 March 2021.

World records
Over the course of its history, one world record has been set at the Copernicus Cup.

Meeting Records

Men

Women

See also
Sport in Poland

References

External links
 Official website
 Meeting Records

Athletics competitions in Poland
Winter events in Poland
World Athletics Indoor Tour